This is a list of current and former SportsCenter anchors and reporters since the television show debuted on September 7, 1979.

SportsCenter anchors

Current SportsCenter anchors

Cristina Alexander: (2022–present)
John Anderson: (1999–present)
Victoria Arlen: (2018–present)
Matt Barrie: (2013–present)
Chris Berman: (1979–present), occasional anchor
Ashley Brewer: (2020–present), based in Los Angeles
John Brickley: (2020–present)
Nicole Briscoe: (2015–present)
John Buccigross: (1996–present)
Linda Cohn: (1992–present), based in Los Angeles
Antonietta Collins: (2016–present)
Kevin Connors: (2008–present)
Rece Davis: (1995–present), studio host with ESPN, still anchors SportsCenter on occasion
Olivia Dekker: (2020–present)
Elle Duncan: (2016–present)
Michael Eaves: (2016-present)
Neil Everett: (2000–present), based in Los Angeles
Katie George: (2020–present)
Jay Harris: (2003–present)
Cassidy Hubbarth: (2012–present)
Doug Kezirian: (2012–present)
Suzy Kolber: (1993–1996), (1999–present), now a studio host for NFL Insiders and host of Monday Night Countdown, still anchors SportsCenter on occasion
Jen Lada: (2018–present)
Alyssa Lang: (2019–present)
Steve Levy: (1993–present), also a play-by-play commentator
David Lloyd: (1998–present)
Jade McCarthy: (2012–2017, 2022–present)
Molly McGrath: (2020–present)
Zubin Mehenti: (2011–present)
Phil Murphy: (2021-present)
Kevin Negandhi: (2008–present)
Arda Ocal: (2017-2018, 2021-present)
Molly Qerim: (2018–present)
Samantha Ponder: (2019–present)
Karl Ravech: (1993–present), also on [Baseball Tonight]
Kelsey Riggs: (2020–present)
Dianna Russini: (2015–present)
Laura Rutledge: (2018–present)
Randy Scott: (2012–present)
Ryan Smith: (2019–present)
Michele Steele: (2011–present)
Sage Steele: (2007–present)
Hannah Storm: (2008–present)
Gary Striewski: (2018–present)
Danielle Trotta: (2022–present)
Scott Van Pelt: (2001–present), based in Washington, D.C.
Stan Verrett: (2000–present), based in Los Angeles
Sara Walsh: (2010–2017, 2022–present), also on Fox Sports and NFL Network
Heidi Watney: (2023–present), based in Los Angeles

Former SportsCenter anchors
 Jorge Andres: (2011–2015), formerly with American Sports Network, now with CBS Sports
 Larry Beil: (1996–1999), now sports director at KGO-TV (ABC) in San Francisco
 Steve Berthiaume: (2000–2006, 2007–2012), now a play-by-play commentator for the Arizona Diamondbacks television broadcasts on Bally Sports Arizona
 Michelle Bonner: (2005–2012), now runs her own public relations and consulting group
 Tim Brando: (1986–1994), now with Fox Sports as a play-by-play commentator 
 Max Bretos: (2010–2019) Left ESPN to join LAFC full time
 Cindy Brunson: (1999–2012), now with Bally Sports Arizona
 Steve Bunin: (2003–2012), was with Comcast SportsNet Houston (now AT&T SportsNet Southwest) until October 2014, now a morning news anchor at KING-TV
 Cara Capuano: (2000–2004), now with ESPNU
 Cari Champion: (2012–2020) Left ESPN January 29, 2020
 Cary Chow: (2017-2019), now at WRC-TV in Washington, D.C.
 Eric Clemons: (1987–1991), now freelancing 
 Jonathan Coachman: (2009–2017), now in his second stint with WWE as color commentator for WWE Raw 
 Kevin Corke: (1999–2003), now with Fox News
 Jay Crawford: (2012–2017), among the 100 staffers who were let go by ESPN on April 26, 2017; later an executive in residence at Bowling Green State University, now with WKYC (NBC) in Cleveland
 Lindsay Czarniak (2011–2017), now produces digital content and features for Joe Gibbs Racing; also serves as sideline reporter for NFL on Fox
 Jack Edwards: (1991–2003), now a play-by-play announcer for the Boston Bruins on NESN
 Rich Eisen: (1996–2003), now with NFL Network
 Josh Elliott: (2006–2011), now with CBS News
 Dave Feldman: (1996–2000), now with NBC Sports Bay Area
 Robert Flores: (2007–2016), now with MLB Network and NHL Network
 Chris Fowler: (1989–1993), now a studio host for the network, including ESPN's College GameDay (1993–2014); he is also a lead play-by-play commentator for ESPN's college football coverage, including ABC's Saturday Night Football
 Kevin Frazier: (2002–2004), now with Entertainment Tonight
 Gayle Gardner: (1983–1988), retired from broadcasting
 Rhonda Glenn: (1981–??)
 George Grande: (1979–1988), former sports commentator for Cincinnati Reds television broadcasts on Fox Sports Ohio, now retired
 Mike Greenberg: (1996–2017), now co-host of Get Up! on ESPN
 Todd Grisham: (2011–2016), now a play-by-play commentator for the Ultimate Fighting Championship
 Greg Gumbel: (1979–1988), now in his second stint with CBS Sports
 Brett Haber: (1994–1997), now commentator for the Tennis Channel
 Mike Hall: (2004–2005), formerly with ESPNU from March 4, 2005 to April 27, 2007, now with Big Ten Network
 Chris Hassel: (2013-2017), among the 100 staffers who were let go by ESPN on April 26, 2017; now with CBS Sports
 Darren M. Haynes: (2014-2017), now with WUSA in Washington, DC as a sports director for the station
 Fred Hickman: (2004–2008), formerly with WVUE-DT in New Orleans, Louisiana as a sports director for the station, now a news anchor at WDVM-TV in Hagerstown, Maryland
 Jemele Hill: (2017–2018), now with The Undefeated
 Mike Hill: (2008–2013), now with FS1
 Jason Jackson: (1995–2002), now a broadcaster for the Miami Heat
 Dana Jacobson: (2002–2006, 2011–2012), now with CBS News and Sports.
 Brian Kenny: (1997–2011), now with the MLB Network
Nabil Karim: (2019–2022), now with Turner Sports
 Lisa Kerney: (2014–2018)
 Michael Kim: (1996–2013), now with Stadium
 Craig Kilborn: (1993–1996), former host of Comedy Central's The Daily Show from 1996 to 1998 and CBS's The Late Late Show from 1999 to 2004, now an actor
 Lee Leonard: (1979), was host of a public affairs program on the Comcast Network until that network folded in October 2017; died in 2018
 Bob Ley: (1979-2019), retired on June 30, 2019
 Sal Marchiano: (1979–1984), longtime New York area sportscaster, now retired
 Kenny Mayne: (1994-2021)
 Chris McKendry: (1996–2016), now an on-site host for ESPN's tennis coverage
 Tom Mees: (1979–1996) drowned in 1996
 Gary Miller: (1990–2004), now an anchor at WKRC-TV in Cincinnati 
 Chris Myers: (1987–1998), now with Fox Sports
 Katie Nolan: (2017-2018) (Snapchat edition)
 Dari Nowkhah: (2007–2011), now with SEC Network
 Keith Olbermann: (1992–1997, 2013–2015, 2018-2020)
 Bill Patrick: (1990–1998), now with NBC Sports and NBCSN
 Dan Patrick: (1989–2006), formerly co-hosted NBC's Football Night in America from 2008 to 2017, now a senior writer for Sports Illustrated and host of The Dan Patrick Show on Premiere Networks and Peacock
 Scott Reiss: (2001–2008), now with NBC Sports Bay Area
 Dave Revsine: (1999–2007), now lead anchor of Big Ten Network
 Robin Roberts: (1990–2004), now co-anchor of ABC's Good Morning America
 Treavor Scales: (2018–2021), now with Bally Sports South
 Stuart Scott: (1993–2014), died of cancer in 2015
 Will Selva: (2007–2011), now an anchor for NFL Network
 Bill Seward: (1984, 1996–2000), now a sports anchor at NBC Sports and CBS Radio 
 Jaymee Sire: (2013–2017), among the 100 staffers who were let go by ESPN on April 26, 2017; she is now with the Food Network
 Michael Smith: (2017–2018)
 Charley Steiner: (1987–2001), now a play-by-play commentator for Los Angeles Dodgers radio broadcasts
 Bob Stevens: (1995–2002), started announcing Savannah State football games in 2006
 Mike Tirico: (1991–1997), was a play-by-play commentator for ESPN's Monday Night Football, NBA play-by-play commentator for ESPN and ESPN on ABC; Tirico is now with NBC Sports
 Adnan Virk: (2010–2019), terminated February 3, 2019; now with MLB Network
 Pam Ward: (1996–2004), now a college football and women's college basketball play-by-play commentator for ESPN
 Whit Watson: (1997–2002), now with Golf Channel
 Bram Weinstein: (2010–2015), now the radio play-by-play voice of the Washington Commanders
 Steve Weissman: (2010–2015), now with NFL Network and Tennis Channel
 Matt Winer: (2001–2010), now with Turner Sports and NBA TV

ESPN reporters
Chris Connelly: (2001–present) essayist
Bob Holtzman: (2001–present) Cincinnati-based bureau reporter
Chris Mortensen: (1991–present) Atlanta-based bureau reporter; National Football League reporter
Wendi Nix: (2006–present) Boston-based bureau reporter; she is also one of the hosts of College Football Live, an in-studio contributor on Sunday NFL Countdown (since 2014) and anchors SportsCenter on occasion
Sal Paolantonio: (1995–present) Philadelphia and New York City-based bureau reporter; NFL reporter
T. J. Quinn: (2007–present) investigative reporter and Outside the Lines fill-in host
Lisa Salters: (2002–present) Los Angeles-based bureau reporter; Monday Night Football sideline reporter (since 2012)
Jeremy Schaap: (1996–present) New York City-based bureau reporter, Outside the Lines host and E:60 co-host (since May 14, 2017)
Joe Schad: (2005–present) college football reporter
Adam Schefter: (2009–present) NFL reporter/insider
Shelley Smith: (1992–present) Los Angeles-based bureau reporter
Ed Werder: (1998-2017, 2019-present), rejoined ESPN on August 12, 2019 as a Dallas-based bureau reporter; he was previously an NFL reporter for ESPN during his first stint with the network until he was laid off on April 26, 2017

Former SportsCenter reporters
David Aldridge: (1996–2004), now a reporter for NBA on TNT and NBA TV
David Amber: (2005–2010), now with Sportsnet
Erin Andrews: (2004–2012), currently with Fox Sports
Anne Marie Anderson: (2007), now with the Pac-12 Network
Bonnie Bernstein: (1995–1998, 2006–2009), now a co-host of The Michael Kay Show on WEPN in New York
Jenn Brown: (2009–2012)
John Clayton: (1995–2017), NFL reporter, died March 18, 2022. 
Colleen Dominguez: (2004–2014), Los Angeles-based bureau reporter
Jeannine Edwards: (1995–2017), retired on December 29, 2017
Alex Flanagan: (1998–2006), now a reporter for the NFL Network and NBC Sports
Peter Gammons: (1990–2009), MLB reporter for ESPN, now in same capacity for the MLB Network
Hank Goldberg: (1993–2022) Miami-based bureau reporter; died on July 4, 2022
Pedro Gomez: (2003–2021) West Coast based reporter; died on February 7, 2021
Ann Kreiter (formerly Ann Werner): (1990–2000), now an anchor and studio host at BTN
Andrea Kremer: (1990–2006), now with NFL Network
Mark Malone: (1994–2004), now a football color commentator for Westwood One Radio Network
Mike Massaro: (2001-2014), was with NBC Sports as a pit reporter for the network's NASCAR coverage until December 2016 
Rachel Nichols: (2004–2013), (2016–2022) NBA reporter
Pam Oliver: (1993–1995), now with Fox Sports
Lou Palmer: (1979–1985), retired
Tom Rinaldi: (2003–2020) New York City-based bureau reporter; First Take fill-in co-host; now with Fox Sports
Jimmy Roberts: (1988–2000), now with NBC Sports
Shannon Spake: (2007–2016), now with Fox Sports
Melissa Stark: (1999–2003), now a reporter for the NFL Network
Michele Tafoya: (2000–2011), now with NBC Sports

See also
 List of SportsCenter segments and specials

References

SportsCenter anchors and reporters
Anchors and reporters
SportsCenter
+SportsCenter